Route 237 is a short 15 km north/south provincial highway on the south shore of the Saint Lawrence River in Quebec. Its northern terminus is in Stanbridge East at the junction of Route 202 and its southern terminus is in Frelighsburg, where it crosses the US border and continues past the West Berkshire–Frelighsburg Border Crossing into Vermont as Route 108.

Municipalities along Route 237
 Frelighsburg
 Stanbridge East

Major intersections

See also
 List of Quebec provincial highways

References

External links 
 Route 237 on Google Maps
 Provincial Route Map (Courtesy of the Quebec Ministry of Transportation) 

237